Donkey Kong Country 2: Diddy's Kong Quest is a 1995 platform game developed by Rare and published by Nintendo for the Super Nintendo Entertainment System (SNES). It was released on 21 November 1995 in Japan, 4 December in North America, and 14 December in Europe. It is the second installment of the Donkey Kong Country series and the sequel to Donkey Kong Country (1994).

Players control Diddy Kong and his friend Dixie Kong, who must rescue Donkey Kong after he is kidnapped by King K. Rool. The game is set on Crocodile Isle, with eight worlds of varying environments, totaling 52 levels. The game uses the same Silicon Graphics (SGI) technology from the original, which features the use of pre-rendered 3D imagery.

Diddy's Kong Quest received acclaim, being widely regarded as one of the greatest 2D platformers ever made. Praise was directed at its graphics, gameplay, and soundtrack. It was the second-bestselling game of 1995, the sixth-bestselling game on the SNES, and the highest-selling SNES game that was not packaged with the system.

It was re-released for the Game Boy Advance (GBA) in 2004. The game was made available for download on the Virtual Console for the Wii and Wii U in 2007 and 2015, respectively. It was followed by Donkey Kong Country 3: Dixie Kong's Double Trouble! in 1996.

Gameplay

Donkey Kong Country 2: Diddy's Kong Quest is a 2D side-scrolling platformer in which the player controls either Diddy Kong or his childhood friend Dixie Kong through 52 varying levels over eight different worlds. The main objective of the game is to rescue Donkey Kong from King K. Rool. The game features a wide number of enemies, which include land-based reptilian Kremlings, rats, porcupines, bees, and vultures. Enemies in underwater sections include pufferfish, stingrays and piranhas. Each world culminates with a boss fight, which is required to be defeated in order to progress to the next world. Similar to its predecessor, the player-characters may neutralise most hostiles by jumping on their heads, cartwheeling through them, or throwing a barrel at them. When hit by an enemy, the active character leaves the screen, thus control will switch to the other character. The player can reclaim their partner from marked DK barrels throughout the game. If both characters die, the player will lose a life and will restart from either the beginning of the level or from the last checkpoint, which comes in the form of a star-painted barrel. If the player loses all of their lives, the game will end.

Diddy and Dixie have unique attributes; Diddy is more agile and will run faster, whereas Dixie has a higher jump and can spin her hair in order to glide. The player can pick up the other character and throw them in any direction, similar to barrels. The game also features "animal friends", which returns from its predecessor. Playable animals include Squitter the spider, Rambi the rhino, Rattly the snake, Enguarde the swordfish and Squawks the parrot. These animals have unique abilities, such as Rambi's ability to charge at enemies, Squawks' ability of flight, and Rattly's ability to jump extreme heights.

The game features environmental effects throughout some levels, which include fog, rain, and thunderstorms. Some levels feature different mechanics and settings, such as underwater sections, riding a mine cart, grappling onto vines, and beehive levels which feature sticky honey-covered surfaces. As with its predecessor, the game features barrels that will propel the player in any direction they are facing. Aside from checkpoint barrels, some give the player temporary invincibility or an "animal friend". Bonus barrels hidden throughout the game transport the player to a bonus game, which features a challenge such as eliminating all enemies in order to earn a "Kremcoin". In addition, there are some barrels that can only be activated by a specific character. Players may earn extra lives by collecting balloons, earning 100 bananas or collecting four letters which spell "KONG".

The player can achieve a maximum completion score of 102% for their save file by completing all levels and bosses, completing all bonus challenges, collecting all DK coins within the Lost World and visiting each of the four Kong family members at least once.

The game is Dixie Kong's first appearance in the Donkey Kong franchise. Other characters include Cranky Kong, situated in "Monkey Museum", who is back due to "popular demand" to divulge secrets of the game world and provide comic relief, as well as offer advice. Wrinkly Kong, the wife of Cranky Kong and grandmother of Donkey Kong, makes her first appearance in this game. She runs an educational facility called "Kong Kollege", where she gives guidance to the player. Swanky Kong runs a game show quiz where the player may complete quizzes and earn extra lives. Funky Kong offers an aeroplane that allows the players to switch between already completed worlds. Additionally, the player can meet a large Kremling called "Klubba", at "Klubba's Kiosk", who demands fifteen Kremkoins from the characters if they want to travel to the "Lost World" and complete a secret level.

Plot
Some time after Donkey Kong Country, Donkey Kong is relaxing on the beach, until he is ambushed by the Kremlings. He gets kidnapped and brought to Kaptain K. Rool, King K. Rool's moniker in this game, who then demands the Banana Hoard he unsuccessfully tried to steal in the previous game for a ransom from the Kongs. Instead of complying, Diddy Kong and his friend Dixie resolve to go to the Kremling's home island, Crocodile Isle, to rescue Donkey Kong. Together, they travel through Crocodile Isle and are helped on their way by an assortment of animals to defeat Kaptain K. Rool. Diddy and Dixie eventually battle and defeat K. Rool, releasing Donkey Kong in the process. K. Rool manages to escape though, and shortly after, Diddy and Dixie confront him in the Lost World, a secret area powered by a geyser at the heart of Crocodile Isle. They once again defeat K. Rool, who is hurled into the geyser, causing it to clog up and explode. The explosion causes all of Crocodile Isle to sink, as the Kongs watch K. Rool escape on a small sailboat.

Development
Development of Diddy's Kong Quest began shortly after the release of Donkey Kong Country, but before its commercial success; the employees of Rare desired to present new concepts. Rare founder Tim Stamper served as director of the game, whereas his colleague Brendan Gunn, who had worked on the original, returned to design the game. In response to complaints from veteran gamers, the game was designed to be more challenging than its predecessor. Several working titles were considered, including DK Rescue!, Diddy's Day Out, Diddy's Wild Country, and Diddy's Wild Frontier. Diddy Kong's Quest was decided on, but was slightly altered into Diddy's Kong Quest to create a play on the word "conquest". The game was re-released for the Game Boy Advance in 2004 and a Virtual Boy port was in development at one time but never released.

The game was announced at E3 1995.

Diddy's Kong Quest, like its predecessor, uses Silicon Graphics (SGI) and Advanced Computer Modelling (ACM) rendering technology, in which pre-rendered images are modelled as 3D objects and then transformed into 2D sprites and background layers. The game's pirate-themed narrative and level design was influenced by designer Gregg Mayles's fascination with the Golden Age of Piracy. The team attempted to maintain the sense of speed and requirement of timing from the previous game. To avoid reproducing the same game entirely, Mayles altered the gameplay to be less linear and more encouraging of exploration, while respecting the basics of fluidity and speed.

In order to surprise players, the team decided to cast Diddy Kong as the main character as opposed to Donkey Kong. Mayles said that he dared to do without the iconic character of the series because his team's youth (Mayles himself was 23 during development) allowed them to disregard risks. The team preserved the gameplay mechanic of controlling two characters, which led into the creation of Dixie Kong. While Donkey and Diddy Kong controlled similarly, the team decided to establish a character with very different abilities to force the player to change between characters regularly. To achieve this difference, the team gave Dixie the ability to hover and descend gradually. Dixie was modeled and animated by Steve Mayles. According to Gregg, the choice to introduce a female character was decided before the creation of her ponytail, and neither the hovering mechanism nor the intention to increase female representation in video games were an influence in the matter. The ponytail was initially given to create a trailing visual effect when Dixie runs, and Gregg decided to put the ponytail to use upon seeing this effect in action. The concept of Dixie descending by using her ponytail as a helicopter blade was then created. Due to the time-consuming nature of the modeling process, Diddy's model was used as the base for Dixie; the ponytail was then added, the clothes were changed, and his features were made more feminine. Nearly fifty names were considered for Dixie, including Didene, Dee, Daisy, Dandi, Dolly, Dizzie, Danni, Dippy and Ducky. The team initially opted for Diddiane before finally deciding on Dixie. Shigeru Miyamoto participated in the creation of the game's characters, as he had for the previous game. Miyamoto offered different motifs to adorn Dixie's beret with, including a banana, a heart and a logo, namely one inspired by that of the musical group ABBA. Rare incorporated the idea for a logo and placed a small version of the company's own on Dixie's beret in early promotional art. The creation of Dixie came at the expense of Donkey Kong's fiancée Candy Kong, who was removed from the game's cast due to Nintendo's concerns over her sexually provocative nature. The design choice to have Diddy and Dixie transform into the friendly animals that were initially mounted in the previous game was made out of concerns over sprite size; additionally, Gregg noted that having the two player characters clinging onto a parrot would significantly reduce its maneuverability.

Audio
The soundtrack of Diddy's Kong Quest was composed by David Wise and was released in the United States as The Original Donkey Kong Country 2 Soundtrack. The soundtrack maintains similarity to its predecessor with its prominent percussion and eclectic genres ranging between big band, disco and hip hop. The melodies and rhythms are largely comical in tone, but occasionally melancholic. Certain themes are reminiscent of compositions by Vangelis and Phil Collins. Wise cited Koji Kondo's music for the Mario and Zelda games, Geoff and Tim Follin's music for Plok!, and synthesizer-based film soundtracks released in the 1980s as influences in creating the music for the Donkey Kong Country series. As with its predecessor, the music was produced for the SNES's SPC700 chip for the game to sound similar to the Korg Wavestation synthesizer.

The track "Stickerbush Symphony" has received particular critical acclaim. Writing for Kotaku, Ethan Gach called it "melancholic and reflective" while still "up-tempo enough to be a bop" and that when combined with its accompanying level, it was "one of the most transcendent platforming moments in the genre".

The game's soundtrack was the focus of an OverClocked ReMix collaboration, Serious Monkey Business. The final track, "Donkey Kong Rescued", was remixed by David Wise himself, featuring Grant Kirkhope on electric guitar and Robin Beanland on trumpet.

Reception

Upon release, retailers struggled to meet the demand for the game. Diddy's Kong Quest sold a combined 4.37 million copies in the United States and Japan on the SNES; the total number of copies sold in Japan at 2.21 million, and 2.16 million in the United States. It was the second best-selling game of 1995, after Yoshi's Island, and the sixth best-selling game on the SNES.

The game received critical acclaim. The SNES version holds an aggregate score of 92% at GameRankings, whereas the Virtual Console re-release and the Game Boy Advance version both hold a score of 80% at GameRankings and Metacritic, respectively.

The graphics and gameplay were the most praised aspects of the game. Scary Larry of GamePro hailed the game as being longer, more graphically impressive, and more fun than the original Donkey Kong Country, and having some of the most cleverly illustrated levels ever seen on a home system. He gave it a perfect 5/5 in all four categories (graphics, sound, control, and FunFactor), and said his one reservation is that some levels are too difficult for younger players. Aaron Kosydar of AllGame thought that Diddy's Kong Quests graphics were superior to that of its predecessor. Dan Whitehead of Eurogamer said that the graphics of the game were similar to the first Donkey Kong Country instalment, although he praised them both as "impressive". However, Whitehead expressed concern over the lack of ambition from the sequel, stating that the gameplay uses the defense of "if it ain't broke, don't fix it". Reviewing the SNES version, Frank Provo of GameSpot heralded the graphics as "more detailed" although admitting that it appeared stylistically similar to the first game. In a separate review regarding the Game Boy Advance version, Provo praised the graphics as richer and "livelier" than those of the original. In a retrospective review, Mark Birnbaum of IGN stated that whilst the original "boasted some of the most beautiful graphics" on the SNES at the time, Diddy's Kong Quest offered a superior experience due to its detail, smooth animation and varying colour palette.

Jeff Pearson of Nintendojo stated that Rare improved the graphics for Diddy's Kong Quest, and that the character animations appeared "much smoother and more cartoon like" in contrast to the computer-generated feel of the original. Pearson also heralded the background designs as reaching "newer heights" of quality. A reviewer of Cubed3 heralded the visuals as "unbelievable" for a 16-bit game. A reviewer of Jeux Video stated that the game "pushed the boundaries" of the console and that every detail was "devilishly handsome", and also praised the handling of the gameplay as being "pushed to a climax". In 2018, Complex ranked the game 17th on their "The Best Super Nintendo Games of All Time".

Sequels and re-releases
A direct sequel, Donkey Kong Country 3: Dixie Kong's Double Trouble!, was released for the SNES in 1996 to positive reviews. In the game, Dixie Kong and Kiddy Kong must find both Donkey and Diddy Kong, who have disappeared while exploring the Northern Kremisphere, which has been invaded by the Kremlings. It was further followed by a succession of more related Donkey Kong video games, such as Donkey Kong 64 in 1999 and Donkey Kong Country Returns in 2010. Diddy's Kong Quest was later released for the Game Boy Advance in November 2004 and the Wii's Virtual Console in May 2007. It was made available for the Wii U and New Nintendo 3DS Virtual Console in 2015 and 2016, respectively. It was later released on the Nintendo Switch via the Nintendo Switch Online service on September 23, 2020.

In the United States, the game's Game Boy Advance version sold 630,000 copies and earned $19 million by August 2006. During the period between January 2000 and August 2006, it was the 41st highest-selling game launched for the Game Boy Advance, Nintendo DS or PlayStation Portable in that country.

Notes

References

External links

  at the Internet Archive
Official Nintendo Wii minisite  at the Internet archive

1995 video games
2004 video games
Cancelled Virtual Boy games
Cooperative video games
Donkey Kong Country
Donkey Kong platform games
Game Boy Advance games
Rare (company) games
Super Nintendo Entertainment System games
Video games about pirates
Video game sequels
Video games featuring female protagonists
Video games set in amusement parks
Video games set on fictional islands
Virtual Console games
Virtual Console games for Wii U
Video games with pre-rendered 3D graphics
Multiplayer and single-player video games
Video games scored by David Wise
Video games about ghosts
Video games with digitized sprites
Nintendo Switch Online games
VSDA Game of the Year winners
Virtual Console games for Nintendo 3DS
Video games developed in the United Kingdom